Central Lithuanian Offensive on Kaunas was a military offensive of the Republic of Central Lithuania, led by general Lucjan Żeligowski, on the territories of Lithuania, that took place between October and 30 November 1920.

The offensive 
On 12 October 1920, soldiers of Second Polish Republic, led by general Lucjan Żeligowski, attacked Lithuania, in an event known as Żeligowski's Mutiny. Following this, the eastern part of the country was separated, forming Republic of Central Lithuania, a puppet state of Poland. In the second half of November, Army of Central Lithuania, led by Żeligowski, attacked Lithuania, heading to Kaunas. Following the attack, it occupied towns of Lentvaris, Trakai, Rykantai, Didžioji Riešė and Nemenčinė. 3rd Infantry Division had begun the counterattack on 18 November. After it failed, Lithuanian forces had retreated.

After that, the Central Lithuanian army advanced to Vievis, Širvintos and Giedraičiai. At that time, the staff of the 1st Infantry Division had been captured. The volunteers from Poland had joined the Żeligowski's army, though many of them were left without proper armament. Following that, general Żeligowski proposed the peace negotiations, however, Lithuania refused. After that, Żeligowski's army continued advancing towards Videniškiai, Želva and Lyduokiai, however, Lithuanian managed to stop his forces.

The next operation had been started in the second half of November and aimed to capture Kaunas. Central Lithuanian forced headed towards the city and on 21 November 1920 stopped on the Nevėžis river near Kėdainiai, 50 km (31 miles) from Kaunas. Due to lack of people and armament, infantry being left behind the cavalry and Poland pressing for a truce, under the international pressure, both sides had signed the truce on that day. The peace negotiation in Kaunas, led by League of Nations, lead to the signing of the peace treaty, and officially started the armistice on 30 November 1920.

Aftermath 
Following the singing of treaty of Kaunas, both sides stopped fighting and exchanged the prisoners of war. League of Nations had established the demilitarised zone of Polish–Lithuanian Neutral Strip that was formed on the border of Lithuania and Central Lithuania, and existed from 17 December 1920 to 22 May 1923. Additionally, the League of Nations started preparing the plebiscite in Vilnius Region, which was meant to define whether the local population preferred to be a part of Lithuania or Central Lithuania (and later Poland), however, it never happened.

Citations

References

Bibliography 
 

 

Conflicts in 1920
Republic of Central Lithuania
1920 in Poland
1920 in Lithuania
Lithuania–Poland military relations
Wars involving Lithuania
Wars involving Poland